Joseph Serlin (1868-1944) was a French politician. He served as a member of the French Senate from 1933 to 1941, representing Isère. He was assassinated by pro-German forces for his ties to the French Resistance.

References

1868 births
1944 deaths
People from Isère
French Senators of the Third Republic
Senators of Isère